Jade Mariah Parsons (born 6 November 1990) is a Canadian freestyle wrestler.

Career 

In 2018, she competed at the Klippan Lady Open in Klippan, Sweden without winning a medal. Later that year, she represented Canada in the women's freestyle event of the 2018 Wrestling World Cup. In the pool stage she lost her matches against Becka Leathers and Mayu Mukaida but she secured a win against Liliana Juarez. Canada went on to compete for fifth place against Belarus. In this match Parsons lost against Iryna Kurachkina though Canada did win enough matches to finish in fifth place. In 2018, she also competed in the women's freestyle 55 kg event at the 2018 World Wrestling Championships held in Budapest, Hungary without winning a medal. Parsons was eliminated in her first match by Zhang Qi.

In 2019, she represented Canada at the 2019 Pan American Games held in Lima, Peru and she won one of the bronze medals in the 53 kg event. In the same year, she also competed in the women's freestyle 55 kg event at the 2019 World Wrestling Championships held in Nur-Sultan, Kazakhstan without winning a medal. Parsons lost her first match against Nanami Irie of Japan and she was eliminated in her next match against Olga Khoroshavtseva of Russia.

At the 2020 Pan American Wrestling Championships held in Ottawa, Canada, she won the silver medal in the 53 kg event. In the final, she lost against Luisa Valverde of Ecuador.

Achievements

References

External links 
 

Living people
1990 births
Place of birth missing (living people)
Canadian female sport wrestlers
Pan American Games medalists in wrestling
Pan American Games bronze medalists for Canada
Wrestlers at the 2019 Pan American Games
Medalists at the 2019 Pan American Games
Pan American Wrestling Championships medalists
20th-century Canadian women
21st-century Canadian women